In music, Op. 164 stands for Opus number 164. Compositions that are assigned this number include:

 Rheinberger – Der Stern von Bethlehem
 Saint-Saëns – Aux conquérants de l'air
 Strauss – Dorfschwalben aus Österreich